A captive audience meeting is a mandatory meeting during working hours, organized by an employer with the purpose of discouraging employees from organizing or joining a labor union. It is considered a union busting tactic. Critics allege that captive audience meetings are used to intimidate workers and spread misinformation; employees can be fired for failing to participate in the meeting or for asking questions. In the United States, the National Labor Relations Act of 1935 (NLRA) broadly permits captive audience meetings but does not allow them to be held in the final 24 hours prior to a union election. Employers defend the practice as protected free speech; critics view the practice as an infringement on workers' rights not to listen.

Captive audience meetings are held in about 90% of labor elections; union win rates are inversely correlated with the number of captive audience meetings held.

In February 2021, the Protecting the Right to Organize Act ("PRO Act") was proposed in the U.S. House of Representatives. Among other things, the PRO Act would make captive audience meetings illegal as an "unfair labor practice".

Legality 
Currently two US states, Oregon and Connecticut ban captive audience meetings.

NLRB rulings 

J. Warren Madden, the NLRB's first chair had issued rulings which required employers to remain neutral during union organizing campaigns and elections. The Supreme Court disagreed, however, and said in NLRB v. Virginia Electric & Power Co., 314 US 469 (1941), that employers could express their opinion about unions and union organizing efforts so long as that speech was not coercive. The NLRB subsequently held employer speech was not coercive unless blatantly so or part of a broad pattern of coercive conduct.

But captive audience meetings, a majority of the board felt, were different. A captive audience meeting occurs when an employer requires employees to meet on company time and listen to anti-union speech. After NLRB v. Virginia Electric & Power Co., the NLRB continued to issue rulings that held that captive audience meetings were a per se violation of the NLRA.

Sections of the Taft–Hartley Act were designed to overturn these rulings. In November 1946, voters elected Republican majorities in the Congressional House and Senate. These Republicans were outraged by the NLRB's captive audience rulings. When Congress enacted the Taft-Hartley Act in 1947, Section 8(c) specifically allowed captive audience meetings so long as the employer made no threat of reprisal, threat of force, or promised any benefits during the meeting.

During the tenure of chair Paul Herzog, the NLRB nevertheless continued to issue a series of rulings which held that unions should be granted equal time whenever an employer held a captive audience meeting. In Babcock & Wilcox , 77 NLRB 577 (1948), the Board even held that unions were permitted to equal time during captive audience meetings. These rulings became known as the Bonwit Teller doctrine, after the name of the first of the post-Taft-Hartley Act captive audience rulings.

Guy Otto Farmer publicly stated his opposition to the Bonwit Teller rulings during the confirmation process. In December 1953, Farmer convinced Democratic appointee Ivar Peterson to join Farmer and Rodgers in deciding Livingston Shirt Corp., which overturned Bonwit Teller. Although Peterson agreed with the outcome of the decision, his rationale for reaching the verdict was on much narrower legal grounds. Farmer did not, however, find the employer's right to hold captive audience meetings absolute.  In Peerless Plywood Co. Farmer, Rodgers, and Peterson agreed that employers may not hold captive audience meetings within 24 hours of a union representation election. Two years later, in Economic Machinery Co., Farmer led a unanimous board in holding that one-on-one conversations between the employer and employee about the union is inherently coercive.

In April 2022, Jennifer Abruzzo, general counsel of the NLRB, issued a memorandum calling for the board to find captive audience meetings unlawful.

See also 
 History of union busting in the United States

References 

Labor relations
Trade unions